El Mandara is a neighborhood in Alexandria, Egypt.

Ancient site
The modern neighborhood of El Mandara is identified with the ancient town of Taposiris or Chersonesus Parva, which was mentioned by the ancient writers Strabo and Ptolemy. The ancient Greek geographer Strabo wrote that young people of Alexandria would celebrate feasts in the neighborhood. There are few remains of the ancient town today.

See also 
 Neighborhoods in Alexandria

Notes

Populated places in Alexandria Governorate
Neighbourhoods of Alexandria